The Anchorage School District (ASD) manages all public schools within the Municipality of Anchorage in the U.S. state of Alaska. It is the 107th largest school district in the United States, serving over 45,000 students in more than 90 schools.

Operations
The district includes all of Anchorage municipality.

District superintendent Carol Comeau, appointed in December 2000,  retired June 30, 2012. She was succeeded by Jim Browder. After eight months, Jim Browder resigned and was replaced by Ed Graff; later in 2015 Ed Graff was replaced by Deena Bishop (formerly Deena Paramo), previously the Superintendent of Matsu Valley School District. Bishop resigned at the end of the 2022 school term and was replaced by Jharrett Bryantt.

Demographics
In the 2018-2019 school year, the Anchorage School District enrolled approximately 46,695 students. In terms of race and ethnicity, the Anchorage School District is considered a minority-majority district, meaning the minority groups make up the majority of the district's population. Non-white students make up roughly 58 percent of the school district's student body.

Composition:

The district served approximately 8,600 students with special needs who were eligible for special education services in 2008-09. Also that year, the district's English Language Learner program for students with limited English Proficiency served 5,808 students and the Gifted program assisted 3,563 students.

Instruction
In 2008-09, the district's graduation rate was 70.48 percent. It has increased nearly 11 percentage points since the 2004-05 school year. The dropout rate for ASD students is 3.43 percent, a figure that has been cut nearly in half since the 2004-05 school year.

In 2009-10, ASD had 48 teachers certified by the National Board for Professional Teaching Standards. National board certification is voluntary and involves a rigorous performance-based assessment that takes one to three years for a successful candidate to achieve. The certification complements, but does not replace a state's teacher certificate. It is valid for 10 years and establishes the teacher as “highly qualified” and a “master” teacher in the eyes of the district and state.

In 2009-10, 99 percent of new teachers were highly qualified. The remaining 1 percent were unable to prove their HQT status and were terminated. As of May 1, 2010, the state HQT reports 95.4 percent of ASD teachers had an HQT designation in the content area they were teaching. To put this into perspective almost six years after the State adopted regulations mandating that urban District's limit instruction in core classes to HQ teachers, ASD is still out of compliance, while HQ requirements can be via Praxis examinations.

The district also has approximately 225 certificated employees such as counselors, psychologists, speech pathologists, OT/PT, nurses and more.

ASD's last curriculum audit was conducted in 2002.

22.5 credits are required to graduate high school in the Anchorage School District. All high schools in the Anchorage School District offer AP (Advanced Placement) classes, but only West Anchorage High School offers IB (International Baccalaureate) classes.

Test Scores
The district releases test scores each fall in a comprehensive report called Profile of Performance. See  Expect the Best is a condensed version of that 2,000-page document: it is put forward as an annual report to the community.

In 2008-09 test scores remained relatively flat. Language arts scores declined from 81.4 to 80.4 percent and math scores declined from 73.7 to 71.4 percent since last year. These scores follow three years of steady growth.

In order to make AYP (adequate yearly progress) each school must meet up to 31 specific targets that have been established by the state in which the district is located. Proficiency on state adopted measurements, test participation, attendance, and graduation rates are used to determine AYP for each school each year. 
2008-09 school-wide results for the district's 96 schools are as follows: 
 96 percent met the test participating requirement.
 85 percent met the language arts requirement.
 89 percent met the math requirement.
 97 percent met the attendance/graduation requirement.
Thirty-nine ASD schools met every requirement for which they were accountable. Fifteen missed AYP by just one target; 42 schools missed by two or more targets. Complete coverage, including historical statistics, of federal AYP requirements, are available on the district's website.

In 2009, only some 27% of students in Alaska were proficient in Reading on the NAEP test. For some reason,  though Anchorage's population exceeded 250,000 NAEP did not include Anchorage in its review of Urban Districts.

Food service
On December 16, 2019, news was announced to all students at the schools serving Subway sandwiches for lunch that the district decided to go with more healthy and convenient options for school lunches, removing Subway sandwiches from the menu. It went into effect the second semester of the 2019-2020 school year. In 2022 the English class at Central Middle School under the direction of the great teacher Mr Spence agreed that school lunches could be better.

Schools

High schools 
Bartlett High School
Chugiak High School
Dimond High School
Eagle River High School
East High School
Service High School
South High School
West High School

Middle schools 
Central Middle School of Science
Begich Middle School
Clark Middle School
Goldenview Middle School
Gruening Middle School
Hanshew Middle School
Mears Middle School
Mirror Lake Middle School
Romig Middle School
Wendler Middle School

Combined secondary schools 
Steller Secondary School

Kindergarten - Grade 12 schools 
Polaris K-12 School

Elementary schools 
Abbott Loop Elementary
Airport Heights Elementary
Alpenglow Elementary
Aurora Elementary
Baxter Elementary
Bayshore Elementary
Bear Valley Elementary
Birchwood ABC Elementary
Bowman Elementary
Campbell Elementary
Chester Valley Elementary
Chinook Elementary
Chugach Optional Elementary 
Chugiak Elementary
College Gate Elementary
Creekside Park Elementary
Denali Montessori
Eagle River Elementary
Fairview Elementary
Fire Lake Elementary
Gladys Wood Elementary
Government Hill Elementary
Homestead Elementary
Huffman Elementary
Inlet View Elementary
Kasuun Elementary
Kincaid Elementary
Klatt Elementary
Lake Hood Elementary
Lake Otis Elementary
Mountain View Elementary
Muldoon Elementary
North Star Elementary
Northwood ABC Elementary
Nunaka Valley Elementary
O'Malley Elementary
Ocean View Elementary
Orion Elementary
Ptarmigan Elementary
Rabbit Creek Elementary
Ravenwood Elementary
Rogers Park Elementary
Russian Jack Elementary
Sand Lake Elementary
Scenic Park Elementary
Spring Hill Elementary
Susitna Elementary
Taku Elementary
Trailside Elementary
Tudor Elementary
Turnagain Elementary
Tyson Elementary
Ursa Major Elementary
Ursa Minor Elementary
Williwaw Elementary
Willow Crest Elementary
Wonder Park Elementary

Charter schools 
Alaska Native Cultural Charter School
Aquarian Charter School
Eagle Academy Charter School
Family Partnership Charter School
Frontier Charter School
Highland Tech Academy School
Rilke Schule German School of Arts & Sciences
Winterberry Charter School

Other specialized schools and programs 
ACE/ACT
Alaska State School for the Deaf and Hard of Hearing
AVAIL
Booth Secondary
Benny Benson Secondary School (also known as SAVE II)
Crossroads 7-12
Continuation Program
Girdwood K-8 School
Martin Luther King Jr. Technical High School
McLaughlin Youth Center
Northern Lights ABC K-8
Whaley School

See also

 List of high schools in Alaska
 List of middle schools in Alaska
 List of school districts in Alaska

References

External links